Wendy Rawlings (born 1967) is an American novelist, short story writer, essayist, and critic. She is a professor of English at The University of Alabama.

Rawlings is the author of three books. Come Back Irish, a collection of short stories published by Ohio State University Press in 2001, was hailed by Ron Carlson as "a sharp collection rich with mordant humor that colors [Rawlings'] honest take on the tender estrangements that radiate from love and family." In 2007, Rawlings won the Michigan Literary Fiction Award for her novel, The Agnostics, which was published that year by The University of Michigan Press. Novelist Sigrid Nunez called the novel "a poignant, exquisitely focused book." Her third book, Time for Bed, was published by Louisiana State University Press in 2019.

In addition, Rawlings has published short fiction, essays, and criticism in a variety of journals, including AGNI, The Atlantic, Cincinnati Review, Crab Orchard Review, Fourth Genre, Massachusetts Review, The Normal School, Passages North, The Southern Review, Sonora Review, and Tin House.

Born in Washington D.C. in 1967, Rawlings grew up in Bayville, New York. She received a B.A. from Trinity College (1988), an M.F.A. from Colorado State University (1996), and a Ph.D. from The University of Utah (2000). She has taught creative writing and literature at The University of Alabama since 2000, and lives in Tuscaloosa, Alabama.

Published books
 The Agnostics. A novel. Ann Arbor: University of Michigan Press, 2007
 Come Back Irish. Short stories. Columbus, Ohio: Ohio State University Press, 2001
Time for Bed. Stories. Baton Rouge: Louisiana State University Press, 2019

Awards
Michigan Literary Fiction Award, 2007 
Pushcart Prize, 2016
The Ohio State University Prize in Short Fiction, 2000

References

External links
 Wendy Rawlings' Home Page at The University of Alabama Department of English

American women writers
1967 births
People from Bayville, New York
Trinity College (Connecticut) alumni
Colorado State University alumni
University of Utah alumni
University of Alabama faculty
Writers from Tuscaloosa, Alabama
Living people
American women academics
21st-century American women